Peterborough Transit is the public transport operator for the City of Peterborough, Ontario, & Township of Selwyn, Ontario.

The majority of their system consists of ten main routes within the urban area of Peterborough. There are three community bus routes that serve businesses and seniors homes. There are two Selwyn "The Link" routes that connects the towns of Curve Lake, Lakefield, Ennismore, & Bridgenorth to Trent University. For those who are physically unable to use the regular transit bus there is a special Handi-Van paratransit service. The main & community routes cost $2.75, trans-cab costs $3.50, and Selwyn "The link" routes cost $8 per trip.

History

Transit began in Peterborough as a streetcar service with the Peterborough and Ashburnham Street Railway Company, which was established in 1893 and operated until 1898. This was followed by the Peterborough Radial Railway Company, which operated from 1902 until 1927. This ended the streetcar era in Peterborough.

Cooney and Joplin was briefly the only transit company in the city during 1927 after the Peterborough Radial Railway Company ceased operations. Later during 1927, Border Transit Limited started. It operated through until 1978 at which point the present day Peterborough Transit began operations and continues today.

In June 2020, Peterborough transit route system change from a hub-style transit system to a grid-style transit system due to the Covid-19 pandemic. As a result, there was 9 main routes (down from the original 12 routes) and 3 community bus routes (up from the original 1 route). In May 2021, a new Selwyn "The Link" bus system connecting the major Selwyn towns to Peterborough. In September 2021, Route 11 Water became the 10th route in the transit system. There is no Route 1 in the Peterborough transit system.

Starting on January 2, 2022, all kids 12 years and under will be able to ride the transit system for free as part of a pilot project. The pilot project is expected to run through 2022.

Routes

There are 10 main routes, 3 community bus routes, 2 Selwyn "the link" bus routes and a paratransit service. GO Transit also operates 1 bus from Peterborough to Oshawa.

Main Routes
Routes 2 - 9 operates seven days a week & routes 10 & 11 operates weekdays only. All routes followed by a A, B, or C are shorter, less frequent express routes (excluding 7A). Routes 2, 4, 5, 6, 10, & 11, Express Routes 2A, 2B, 4A, 4B, 6B, & and Go Transit Route 88 serves the Peterborough Terminal, which is located on Simcoe St between Aylmer St N & George St N in the downtown area.

Express Routes

Late Night Routes 
Late Night Routes Serve Peterborough till 3:00 AM on Mondays - Saturdays & 1:00 AM on Sundays.

Community Bus Routes
The community buses connects to major plazas, malls, grocery stores, retirement and long-term care homes, medical clinic, & hospitals within the City of Peterborough.

*Route 21 - Green route service suspended*

Selwyn "The Link" Bus Routes 
Located in Selwyn Township, ON

Other Transit Bus Routes

Criticisms
Many Peterborough Transit riders have criticized buses for being repeatedly late. Since 2005, Peterborough Transit has been slowly implementing changes to improve bus schedules. In 2006, buses began running every 40 minutes, rather than every 30 minutes, since buses would often run every 35–45 minutes anyway. This way, buses could at least meet their schedules.

Peterborough Transit is also frequently criticized for not having buses run late enough. During weekdays, the last bus departs from the terminal at 10:40, even though many riders need buses until around 1:00 am.  It was also criticized for not offering Sunday service, a problem that was fixed in 2006.

The mayor, Daryl Bennett, owner of Capitol Taxi, proposed changes that would result in the cancellation of Saturday service after 6:00 pm. However, on January 31, 2011. Peterborough city council voted against these transit cuts because of the overwhelming number of complaints from residents, and because of the perceived conflict of interest for the mayor.

The buses being required to back out of the bays at the existing terminal eat up roughly 10 minutes before all buses can start their trips.  This can cause buses to end up running behind schedule later on in the day, as the arrival/depart time at the terminal generally falls farther and farther behind the more trips that are made.

Attempts to implement a Community Bus route by merging the Trent East Bank and the Nicholls Park route failed, mainly due to overcrowding issues on the route (renamed to 'Trent Armour'). As a result, the East Bank and Nicholls Park route returned and the Trent Reid and Trent Armour were cancelled.

See also

 Public transport in Canada

References

External links
 Peterborough Transit
 Drawings and photos of Peterborough Transit buses
 Public Transit Operations Review
 

Transit agencies in Ontario
Transport in Peterborough, Ontario